Willem "Wim" de Vries Lentsch, Jr. (20 June 1914, Amsterdam – 27 January 2007, Amsterdam) was a sailor from the Netherlands, who represented his native country at the 1948 Summer Olympics in Torbay. De Vries Lentsch Jr., as helmsman on the Dutch Swallow St. Margrite, took the 11th place with crew Flip Keegstra. In the 1952 Olympics De Vries Lentsch returned as helmsman of the Dutch 5.5 Metre De Ruyter, with crew members Flip Keegstra and Piet Jan van der Giessen. There he took the 13th place.

Wim de Vries Lentsch is the son of Willem de Vries Lentsch.

Sources
 
 
 
 
 
 

1919 births
2007 deaths
Sportspeople from Amsterdam
Dutch male sailors (sport)

Sailors at the 1948 Summer Olympics – Swallow
Sailors at the 1952 Summer Olympics – 5.5 Metre
Olympic sailors of the Netherlands